"Spirit of Chennai" is a 2016 Indian Tamil-language single composed by C Girinandh and directed by Vikram. The song was made  as a flood relief anthem in response to the 2015 South Indian floods which affected Chennai, and was stated by the makers to be a "tribute to all the volunteers".

Production
Following the 2015 South Indian floods which affected Chennai in early December 2015, actor Vikram planned a flood relief anthem to pay homage to the volunteers during the crisis and to celebrate the spirit of the city. Titled "Spirit of Chennai", he worked on composing a song and approached C. Girinandh and his band, Oxygen, to work on a tune for the anthem. The song was composed within two hours, and Vikram called up several prominent singers to record their voices as a part of the track. The lyrics for the song were written by Madhan Karky, Gana Bala and Rokesh.
Vikram subsequently began directing a video song for the anthem featuring several actors from the Indian film industry. The song was unveiled online via Sony Music India on 2 January 2016.

Artists

Singers

Akshita Vikram
Anthony Daasan
Aruna Sairam
Chinmayi
Darshana
Devnath Bhaskara
Dhruv Vikram
Haricharan
Hariharan
'Kaaka Muttai' Ramesh
Karthik
Gana Bala
Gopal Rao
Manikka Vinayagam
Marana Gana Viji
Naresh Iyer
Parthiban
S. P. Balasubrahmanyam
S. P. B. Charan
Shakthisree Gopalan
Shankar Mahadevan
Shweta Mohan
Siddharth
Suchitra
Sujatha
Vijay Gopal
Vijay Prakash
Vikram

Actors and actresses
Source

Abhishek Bachchan
Amala Paul
Ashok Selvan
Bharath
Bobby Simha
Jayam Ravi
Jiiva
'Kaaka Muttai' Ramesh
Karthi
Khushbu
Mumtaj
Narain
Nayantara
Nithya Menen 
Nivin Pauly
Prabhu Deva
Prithviraj
Siddharth
Sivakarthikeyan
Suriya
Varalaxmi Sarathkumar
Vijay Sethupathi
Vikram
Vikranth
Vishnu
Yash

Technicians
Director: Vikram
Producer: Vikram
Studio: The Chiyaan Foundation
Music composer: C. Girinandh
Lyricists: Gana Bala, Madhan Karky and Rokesh
Cinematographer: Om Prakash and Vijay Milton
Editor: Anthony
Choreographer: Sridhar

Musicians

Piano & Programming : C. Girinandh
Melodion: Harish
Electric Violin : Karthick Iyer
Flute: Vijay Gopal
Mridangam, Kanjira & Ghatam : Ramana
Indian Rhythms : Sharath Ravi
Big Drums & Additional programming : Bharath
Guitars: Bob Phukan
Bass Guitar : Carl Fernandes
Nadhaswaram : Balasubramani
Violin : Balaji
Violas : Vinaykumar & Balaji
Cello : Srinivasan
Song Recorded, Mixed & Mastered at Aura Studios Chennai, by Bob Phukan
Sound Engineers: Saurabh Muthusami, Kathiravan & Sukriti

References

External links
Spirit of Chennai Official Song on Youtube

2016 singles
Tamil-language songs
Indian songs
2016 songs